Liwa, or  has developed various meanings in Arabic:
a banner, in all senses (flag, advertising banner, election publicity banner, etc.)
a district; see also: banner (administrative division)
a level of military unit with its own ensign, now used as the equivalent to brigade
an officer commanding a number of liwa units, now equivalent to a major general

Liwa was used interchangeably with the Turkish term sanjak in the time of the Ottoman Empire. After the fall of the empire, the term was used in the Arab countries formerly under Ottoman rule. It was gradually replaced by other terms like qadaa and mintaqa and is now defunct. It is only used occasionally in Syria to refer to the Hatay Province, ceded by the French mandate of Syria to Turkey in 1939, when it was Liwa’ Iskenderun.

References 

Types of administrative division
Arabic words and phrases